Big Data Partnership was a specialist big data professional services company based in London, UK. It provides consultancy, certified training and support to Europe, the Middle East and Africa-based enterprises.

Big Data Partnership provides expertise in platforms including Apache Hadoop, Apache Cassandra, Elasticsearch, Apache HBase, Apache Spark, Apache Storm and Couchbase.

Big Data Partnership was founded in 2012 by Mike Merritt-Holmes, Pinal Gandhi and Tim Seears and formed partnerships with companies including Hortonworks, MapR, WANdisco, Databricks, Amazon Web Services, Intel and Elasticsearch.

In June 2014, Big Data Partnership announced Series A funding led by Beringea LLP, an international venture capital firm with offices in London and Detroit.

In 2016, Big Data Partnership was acquired by Teradata to join their ThinkBig practice.

References

External links
 Official website (archived)
 https://www.forbes.com/sites/trevorclawson/2014/02/06/small-players-in-a-big-data-world/
 https://web.archive.org/web/20140514211347/http://www.builtinlondon.co/big-data-partnership
 http://www.prnewswire.com/news-releases/big-data-partnership-expands-hadoop-offerings-for-emea-enterprises-245789061.html
 http://hortonworks.com/partner/big-data-partnership/
 http://www.channelweb.co.uk/crn-uk/news/2329296/big-data-partnership-offers-intel-hadoop-software
 https://web.archive.org/web/20140514221019/http://techcitynews.com/directory/big-data-partnership/

Big data companies
Technology companies based in London
British companies established in 2012
Teradata